Gainsborough or Gainsboro may refer to:

Places
 Gainsborough, Ipswich, Suffolk, England
 Gainsborough Ward, Ipswich
 Gainsborough, Lincolnshire, a town in England
 Gainsborough (UK Parliament constituency)
 Gainsborough, New South Wales, Australia
 Gainsborough, Saskatchewan, Canada
 Gainsboro, Roanoke, Virginia
 Gainesboro, Tennessee
 Gainesboro, Virginia

People
 Aerith Gainsborough, a fictional character from Final Fantasy VII
 Earl of Gainsborough, a title in the peerage of England and the peerage of the United Kingdom
 Humphrey Gainsborough (1718–1776), English minister and engineer
 Thomas Gainsborough (1727–1788), English painter
 William Gainsborough (died 1307), Bishop of Winchester

Other 
 Gainsborough (crater), on the planet Mercury
 Gainsborough (horse), the 1918 Triple Crown Champion of English Thoroughbred Racing
 HMS Gainsborough, two ships of the Royal Navy
 Gainsborough Pictures, a London-based film studio, active between 1924 and 1951
 Gainsborough melodramas, a group of films made by the studio
 Gainsborough chair, a type of chair made in 18th century England
 Gainsborough hat, a hat in the style of those in Thomas Gainsborough's paintings 
 Gainsboro, a color in the X11 color scheme
 a mullein (plants in the genus Verbascum) cultivar

English toponymic surnames